TSW Today was the news programme on Television South West, the ITV licensee for South West England.

The programme began as Today South West on 4 January 1982, then in 1987 it was renamed Today and in 1989, it became TSW Today.

When Television South West lost its licence to broadcast on Channel 3 and Westcountry Television took over the South West franchise, TSW Today was replaced by Westcountry Live.

Presenters
Kenneth MacLeod
Peter Barraclough
John Doyle
Jerry Harmer
Dominic Heale
Jane Hoffen
Sue King
Ruth Langsford
Chris Rogers
James Wignall
Judi Spiers
Ian Stirling

References

1982 British television series debuts
1992 British television series endings
English-language television shows
ITV regional news shows
Television news in England
Television shows produced by Television South West (TSW)